TOSHIBA 2013 Chinese FA Cup is the 15th edition of Chinese FA Cup. The match of first round was kicked off on 31 March 2013, and finished on 7 December 2013.

The cup title sponsor is Japanese company Toshiba.

Participants

Chinese Super League
Total 16 teams took part in 2013 CFA Cup.

 Beijing Guoan
 Changchun Yatai
 Dalian Aerbin
 Guangzhou EvergrandeTH
 Guangzhou R&F
 Guizhou Moutai
 Hangzhou Greentown
 Jiangsu Sainty
 Liaoning Whowin
 Qingdao Jonoon
 Shandong Luneng Taishan
 Shanghai East Asia
 Shanghai Shenhua
 Shanghai Shenxin
 Tianjin Teda 
 Wuhan Zall

China League One
Total 16 teams took part in 2013 CFA Cup.

 Beijing BIT
 Beijing Baxy
 Chengdu Blades
 Chongqing FC
 Chongqing Lifan
 Guangdong Sunray Cave
 Guizhou Zhicheng
 Harbin Yiteng
 Henan Jianye
 Hubei China-Kyle
 Hunan Billows
 Shenyang Shenbei
 Shenzhen Ruby
 Shijiazhuang Yongchang Junhao
 Tianjin Songjiang
 Yanbian Baekdu Tigers

China League Two & amateur team
16 teams from 2013 China League Two, 2012 China Amateur Football League Final stage, Chinese Collegiate Football League and the Vision China Championship were selected to take part in 2013 CFA Cup.

Dali Ruilong (League Two)
Hebei Zhongji (League Two)
Meixian Hakka (League Two)
Qinghai Senke (League Two)
Shaanxi Laochenggen (League Two)
Hohhot Dongjin (League Two)
Shenzhen Fengpeng (League Two)
Xinjiang Youth (League Two)
Dalian Longjuanfeng (Amateur League)
Qingdao Kunpeng (Amateur League)
Suzhou Jinfu (Amateur League)
Shenyang Riverside Garden (Amateur League)
Jiaozhou Fengfa (Vision China Championship)
Wuhan Hongxing (Vision China Championship)
Zibo Sunday (Vision China Championship)
Tongji University (Collegiate League)

Results
Times listed are UTC+8

First round

Second round

Third round

Fourth round

Quarter-finals

Semi-finals

First leg

Second leg

Guizhou Moutai won 4–2 on aggregate.

Guangzhou Evergrande won 7–3 on aggregate.

Final

First leg

Assistant referees:
 Li Dongnan
 Tong Yong
Fourth official:
Fu Ming

Second leg

Assistant referees:
 Huo Weiming
 Liu Guiqing
Fourth official:
Ma Ning

Awards
 Top Scorer:  Peter Utaka (Beijing Guoan) (4 goals)
 Most Valuable Player:  Darío Conca (Guangzhou Evergrande)
 Fair Play Award: Guizhou Moutai
 Best Coach:  Gong Lei (Guizhou Moutai)

Goalscorers
4 goals
  Peter Utaka (Beijing Guoan)

3 goals

  Joffre Guerrón (Beijing Guoan)
  Guillaume Hoarau (Dalian Aerbin)
  Darío Conca (Guangzhou Evergrande)
  Zlatan Muslimović (Guizhou Moutai)
  Yu Hai (Guizhou Moutai)
  Masashi Oguro (Hangzhou Greentown)
  Pablo Brandán (Liaoning Whowin)
  Edu (Liaoning Whowin)

2 goals

  Wang Xiaolong (Beijing Guoan)
  Ma Xiaolei (Chongqing FC)
  Wang Weicheng (Chongqing Lifan)
  Zhang Chiming (Chongqing Lifan)
  Cui Ri (Dali Ruilong)
  Ma Sai (Dali Ruilong)
  Feng Junyan (Guangzhou Evergrande)
  Muriqui (Guangzhou Evergrande)
  Ni Bo (Guangzhou Evergrande)
  Peng Xinli (Guangzhou Evergrande)
  Davi (Guangzhou R&F)
  Lu Lin (Guangzhou R&F)
  Zvjezdan Misimović (Guizhou Moutai)
  Li Jiahe (Harbin Yiteng) 
  Liu Xinyu (Hunan Billows)
  Aleksandar Jevtić (Jiangsu Sainty)
  Liu Bin (Qingdao Kunpeng)
  Shi Jun (Qinghai Senke)
  Zheng Lei (Shaanxi Laochenggen)
  Yu Le (Shenzhen Ruby)
  Rong Yu (Tianjin Songjiang)

1 goal

  Wang Xin (Dalian Longjuanfeng)
  Xie Wenkai (Beijing BIT)
  Shao Jiayi (Beijing Guoan)
  Wang Hao (Beijing Guoan)
  Xu Yunlong (Beijing Guoan)
  Zhang Xizhe (Beijing Guoan)
  Liu Weidong (Changchun Yatai)
  Zhai Zhaoyu (Chongqing FC)
  Brendon Šantalab (Chongqing Lifan)
  Xu Xiaobo (Chongqing Lifan)
  Tian Yong (Dali Ruilong)
  Wang Peng (Dali Ruilong)
  Yang Zengqi (Dali Ruilong)
  Zheng Wangyang (Dali Ruilong)
  Dong Xuesheng(Dalian Aerbin)
  Daniel Mullen (Dalian Aerbin)
  Sun Bo (Dalian Aerbin)
  Yu Dabao (Dalian Aerbin) 
  Dorielton (Guangdong Sunray Cave) 
  Yang Bin (Guangdong Sunray Cave) 
  Zhang Yong (Guangdong Sunray Cave) 
  Elkeson (Guangzhou Evergrande)
  Gao Lin (Guangzhou Evergrande)
  Huang Bowen (Guangzhou Evergrande)
  Shewket Yalqun (Guangzhou Evergrande)
  Yang Chaosheng (Guangzhou Evergrande)
  Zhang Linpeng (Guangzhou Evergrande)
  Zhao Peng (Guangzhou Evergrande)
  Zhang Shuo (Guangzhou R&F)
  Nano (Guizhou Moutai)
  Yan Xiangchuang (Guizhou Moutai)
  Yang Yihu (Guizhou Moutai)
  Qu Bo (Guizhou Moutai)
  Gu Zhongqing (Guizhou Zhicheng)
  Cao Xuan (Hangzhou Greentown)
  Liu Xiaolong (Harbin Yiteng) 
  Rodrigo (Harbin Yiteng) 
  Ricardo Steer (Harbin Yiteng)  
  Zhang Gen (Hebei Zhongji)
  Zhang Lifeng (Hebei Zhongji) 
  Huang Xiyang (Henan Jianye) 
  Huang Zhun (Hohhot Dongjin)
  Jiang Xiaoyu (Hohhot Dongjin)
  Le Beisi (Hohhot Dongjin)
  Mu Yongjie (Hohhot Dongjin)
  Zhu Dayi (Hohhot Dongjin)
  Liu Qing (Hunan Billows)
  Liu Jianye (Jiangsu Sainty)
  Hamdi Salihi (Jiangsu Sainty)
  Wu Xi (Jiangsu Sainty)
  Feng Tao (Jiaozhou Fengfa)
  Chen Quanjun (Meixian Hakka)
  Pablo Caballero (Qingdao Jonoon)
  Sherzod Karimov (Qingdao Jonoon)
  Song Bo (Qingdao Jonoon)
  Song Wenjie (Qingdao Jonoon)
  Xu Jingjie (Qingdao Jonoon)
  Zhu Shiyu (Qingdao Jonoon)
  Liu Cheng (Qinghai Senke)
  Shan Xialu (Qinghai Senke)
  Zhang Yu (Qinghai Senke)
  Liu Yang (Shaanxi Laochenggen)
  Shen Tianfeng (Shaanxi Laochenggen)
  Wang Si (Shaanxi Laochenggen)
  Yang Jingxuan (Shaanxi Laochenggen)
  Yang Lei (Shaanxi Laochenggen)
  Marius Niculae (Shandong Luneng Taishan)
  Leonardo Pisculichi (Shandong Luneng Taishan)
  Wang Gang (Shandong Luneng Taishan)
  Lin Chuangyi (Shanghai East Asia)
  Mao Jiakang (Shanghai East Asia)
  Cao Yunding (Shanghai Shenhua)
  Wang Changqing (Shanghai Shenhua)
  Jaílton Paraíba (Shanghai Shenxin)
  Zhao Zuojun (Shanghai Shenxin)
  Guan Hongyu (Shenyang Riverside Garden)
  Nan Yunqi (Shenyang Shenbei)
  Tang Miao (Shenzhen Fengpeng)
  Zhang Hongbin (Shenzhen Fengpeng)
  Babacar Gueye (Shenzhen Ruby)
  Ling Sihao (Shenzhen Ruby)
  Ge Yuxiang (Shijiazhuang Yongchang Junhao)
  Yang Lin (Shijiazhuang Yongchang Junhao)
  Chen Bin (Suzhou Jinfu)
  Dinélson (Tianjin Teda)
  Vladimir Jovančić (Tianjin Teda)
  Ma Xiao (Tongji University)
  Wang Zhewei (Tongji University)
  Chen Hao (Wuhan Hongxing)
  Deng Sheng (Wuhan Hongxing)
  Huang Lei (Wuhan Hongxing)
  Zhang Weijun (Wuhan Hongxing)
  Zhang Xiaoxiao (Wuhan Hongxing)
  Ehme (Xinjiang Youth)
  Elijan (Xinjiang Youth)
  Esqerjan (Xinjiang Youth)

Own goals
 Scored for Hangzhou Greentown (1):  Zhang Xian (Wuhan Hongxing)
 Scored for Qingdao Jonoon (1):  Yang Yun (Beijing Guoan)

External links
 Regulations of 2013 Chinese FA Cup

References

2013
2013 in Chinese football
2013 domestic association football cups
Guangzhou F.C. matches